Varavoor Kaplingat Narayana Bhattathiri (1880–1954) was a renowned Vedic scholar, a Sanskrit teacher, a prolific writer, a visionary and a social activist.

Works
V.K.Narayana Bhattathiri wrote more than 500 articles in various newspapers and magazines, in a span of about four decades, beginning from 1915.

Major books written by V.K.Narayana Bhattathiri are:
Vedham Dharmmamulam
Vedha-sandesham
Vedhaardhavicharam

References

Indian Vedic scholars
1880 births
1954 deaths